Bolshaya (Russian language for "big") may refer to:

 Bolshaya, Arkhangelsk, a village 
 Bolshaya chistka, "Great Purge", the 1936–1938 Soviet purge
 Bolshaya Izhora, an urban locality in the Lomonosovsky District of Leningrad Oblast
 Bolshaya Muksalma, one of the Solovetsky Islands
 Bolshaya Polyana, the name of several locations in Russia
 Bolshaya Pyora River (Amur Oblast), a river in the Amur Oblast
 Bolshaya (river) a river on the Kamchatka Peninsula
 Bolshaya Udina, a volcanic massif in the Kamchatka Peninsula